Care Bears is a media franchise owned by American Greetings which began as a series of greeting cards in 1981. Since then, a number of media featuring the eponymous characters have been produced,  including video games. While a Care Bears game was intended for release as far back as 1983 for the Atari 2600, the first officially licensed software entry in the franchise, Care Bears: Care-a-lot Jamboree, debuted in 2003 for Microsoft Windows and Mac OS. Several games, mainly educational titles aimed at younger players, have subsequently been developed, appearing on platforms such as PC, V.Smile, and Game Boy Advance. Numerous mobile phone apps were also released for Android and iOS.

Games

PC/console games

Mobile apps

Cancelled games

References

External links
 Care Bears game franchise at Giant Bomb

Care Bears
Care Bears
Video games
Care Bears